Kuekenthal's emo skink (Emoia kuekenthali) is a species of skink. It is found in Indonesia and the Admiralty Islands.

References

Emoia
Reptiles of Indonesia
Reptiles of Papua New Guinea
Reptiles described in 1895
Taxa named by Oskar Boettger
Skinks of New Guinea